Nicole Houston Reed (born May 17, 1988) is an American actress known for her portrayal of vampire Rosalie Hale in The Twilight Saga (2008–2012). She became known in 2003, after the release of the film Thirteen, directed by Catherine Hardwicke, for which she was credited with Hardwicke as a co-writer of the screenplay, and in which she played a lead role. The film earned Reed an Independent Spirit Award for Best Debut Performance, as well as several nominations.

Early life 
Nicole Houston Reed was born in West Los Angeles, California, to Cheryl Houston, a beautician, and to Seth Reed, a production designer. She has an older brother, Nathan August Reed, and a younger half-brother, Joey Reed. Her mother is a Christian of part Italian descent, whereas her father is Jewish. Reed was raised without religion and has identified as Jewish. She grew up around some Jewish practices, as her brother had a Bar Mitzvah.

Reed has said in numerous interviews that her early home life was "complicated". Her parents divorced when Reed was two, and she was raised by her mother. In 2002, when Reed was 14 years old, she moved out of her mother's house and began living on her own, mainly in apartments in the Los Angeles area. After Thirteens success, Reed returned to Alexander Hamilton High School in Los Angeles, but dropped out again after a year. She said that "mothers who were sneaking into the school at lunchtime to confront and harass her about the film" were the reason for her departure. She earned a high school diploma through homeschooling.

Career 

Catherine Hardwicke, a friend of her mother's, invited her to work on a script with her, when Reed said she was interested in acting. They finished the script for the semi-autobiographical film Thirteen in six days. Producers asked Reed to play a role in the film because they had trouble casting it, as it was an "uncomfortable" role for most young actresses.

The film, also starring Evan Rachel Wood, was released in 2003 to positive reviews, gaining Reed some recognition in Hollywood as both a screenwriter and an actress. Following this, Reed was invited to appear on The Ellen DeGeneres Show and serve as host on a number of award shows, including the Young Hollywood Awards (2003) and the Independent Spirit Awards Nomination Show, followed by the West Independent Spirits Awards, both in 2004. Reed has repeatedly been cast as sexually advanced, precocious teenagers, including her character in Lords of Dogtown (2005), also directed by Hardwicke. In early 2006, she appeared on the series The O.C., playing Sadie, a new love interest for the character Ryan Atwood. Reed appeared on The O.C. at the same time as future Twilight co-stars Cam Gigandet and Jackson Rathbone.

Reed said that her early decision to avoid acting in television series or in mainstream cinema was naïve. She had thought at the time they were not right for her, but had since gained valuable experience in them. She had a lead role in Mini's First Time, which received a limited release in the United States on July 14, 2006. Reed played a teenager who, through seduction, involves her stepfather in a plot to murder her mother. Reed has noted that her character does not "understand the weight of consequence". She said she had enjoyed playing someone who she describes as "crass" and having a "trucker's mouth". Reed's character has sex scenes. As Reed was 16 at the time and legally unable to film such scenes in an explicit way, she was filmed from the back to hide her face. On February 12, 2008, it was announced that Reed would portray Rosalie Hale in the film adaption of Twilight, the first book of a popular four-novel series. Directed by Catherine Hardwicke, it became an international success.

In 2010, Jason Mewes said that he was doing a movie called K-11 with Reed and Kristen Stewart, also of Twilight. The film, directed by Stewart's mother, takes place in a dorm of the Los Angeles County Jail. It was to feature both Stewart and Reed as female characters. Later that year, Reed said that she was no longer part of the project.
In July 2010, Reed joined the cast of the lady assassin action-drama Catch .44, alongside Bruce Willis, Forest Whitaker and Malin Akerman. In November 2010, it was announced that Reed would star with Hayden Panettiere in the film Downers Grove, a movie adaptation of Michael Hornburg's novel. The screenplay was written by Bret Easton Ellis, the novelist who wrote The Rules of Attraction and American Psycho.

In December 2011, it was announced that Reed joined the cast of Pawn, an indie crime thriller directed by David A. Armstrong. The film also stars Forest Whitaker, Ray Liotta, Common, Michael Chiklis, Sean Faris, Stephen Lang, Marton Csokas and Jessica Szohr. In July 2013, Reed joined the cast of the independent sports comedy Balls Out, alongside Jake Lacy, Kate McKinnon, Beck Bennett and Jay Pharoah. The film is about a group of college friends who get together in their final year to play a game of intramural football. In 2019 she appeared in an episode of the Hulu original TV show "Dollface".

Other work 
Reed recorded a song, "Now That I've Found You", with her then-husband Paul McDonald, which debuted on Ryan Seacrest's radio show on November 15, 2011. The couple released their first EP, The Best Part, on October 29, 2012. Their song "All I've Ever Needed" is on The Twilight Saga: Breaking Dawn – Part 2 soundtrack.

In January 2013, Reed filmed Hanson's 2013 music video for their single, "Get the Girl Back", also with McDonald. The video was released in April 2013. Other well-known figures in the video include Kat Dennings, Drake Bell, Drew Seeley, Amy Paffrath, and Alex Beh.

Reed wrote a script set in New Zealand between the 1960s and the 1980s. She has said she feels more versatile than her typecasting in roles of "sexy bad girls". She has sometimes been told by producers that she is too "sexy" for a particular part. In November 2009, Reed directed a music video for her friend Sage while in London. Reed stated that they didn't have much time, or money, but she takes great pride in it.

In 2017, Reed and friend Morgan Bogle set up a sustainable jewelry brand BaYou With Love. The company works with Dell turning recycled technology into jewelry.

Personal life 
Reed met Paul McDonald, a singer-songwriter and former American Idol contestant, on the red carpet at the premiere of Red Riding Hood in March 2011. This moment was broadcast on an American Idol episode as part of a segment that showed the contestants attending the premiere. The couple began dating, and moved in together not long after. They confirmed their engagement in June 2011, and married on October 16, 2011, in Malibu, California. In March 2014, Reed and McDonald announced that they had separated after living apart for the previous six months due to "work obligations". Reed filed for divorce in May 2014, and the divorce was finalized on January 2, 2015.  

Reed began dating actor Ian Somerhalder in mid-2014. They confirmed their engagement in February 2015, and married on April 26, 2015, in Malibu, California. On May 4, 2017, the couple announced via Instagram that Reed was pregnant with their first child. They had a daughter on July 25, 2017. On January 9, 2023, they announced that they are expecting their second child.

Reed is close friends with her Twilight co-star Jackson Rathbone and Spy Kids actress Alexa Vega, who was her matron of honor at her first wedding.

Activism 
Reed teamed up with Staples and Do Something for their third Annual School Supply Drive in the summer of 2011. She is also an animal rights advocate. She volunteers at animal shelters in her free time and she designed a limited edition collar and leash for Gilt to benefit Aspca. On October 22, 2014, she was honored with the ASPCA Compassion Award for her contributions to animal welfare.

Reed endorsed Senator Bernie Sanders for President in the 2016 U.S. presidential election.

Filmography

Awards and nominations

References

External links 

 
 

1988 births
Living people
21st-century American actresses
Actresses from Los Angeles
Alexander Hamilton High School (Los Angeles) alumni
American child actresses
American film actresses
American writers of Italian descent
American women screenwriters
American television actresses
Screenwriters from California